Abubakar Danso Sodangi (born 31 January 1954) was elected Senator for the Nasarawa West constituency of Nasarawa State, Nigeria, taking office in May 1999, and was reelected in 2003 and 2007. He is a member of the ruling party All Progressives Congress (APC).

Education and career 
Abubakar Danso Sodangi was born on 31 January 1954 in Nasarawa, Nasarawa State. 
He worked as a preventive Officer with the Department of Customs & Excise (1974–1977). He then attended the school of Preliminary Studies, Keffi (1977–1979) and the University of Sokoto (1979–1983), gained an LLB (Hons). He attended the Nigeria Law School, Lagos, becoming a Barrister at Law in May 1984. He is a member of several professional bodies including Commonwealth Lawyers Association, African Bar Association, International Bar Association and Human Rights Institute .
He became a Member of the Board of Directors of PRTV, member of the National Human Rights Commission and Assistant Secretary, Federal Capital Territory Judiciary.

Sodangi was one of the founding members of the PDP.
He was elected to the Senate seat in 1999, and was re-elected in 2003 and 2007.
After resuming his seat in 2007, he was appointed to committees on Judiciary, Human Rights & Legal Matters, Interior Affairs, Foreign Affairs and Federal Capital Territory.

In April 2008, a document from the Abuja Geographic Information System surfaced that appeared to show that Sodangi or his family members were owners of 14 residential plots and six commercial plots in the Abuja Federal Capital Territory (FCT).
A letter to the Minister of the FCT, Nasir el-Rufai, showed he had requested plots of land to replace others where the structures had been demolished. The request was granted after el-Rufai left office in May 2007.
Sodangi was chairman of the Senate committee probing the sale of houses in the FCT.
He stated that he had only purchased three houses, to which he was entitled.

In a mid-term evaluation of Senators in May 2009, ThisDay said that Sodangi had not sponsored any bills in the last year, but had worked hard as chairman of the committee probing the FCT. He is currently the Chairman of the Board of trustees of Human Rights Radio,  established to promote respect for  Human Rights in Nigeria.

References

Living people
1954 births
Nasarawa State
Peoples Democratic Party members of the Senate (Nigeria)
20th-century Nigerian politicians
21st-century Nigerian politicians
Nigerian customs service officer
Nigerian customs service personnel
People from Nasarawa State